The 1943 Clemson Tigers football team was an American football that represented Clemson College as a member of the Southern Conference during the 1943 college football season. In their fourth season under head coach Frank Howard, the Tigers compiled a 2–6 record (2–3 against conference opponents), finished seventh in the conference, and were outscored by a total of 185 to 94. The team played its home games at Memorial Stadium in Clemson, South Carolina.

Ralph Jenkins was the team captain. The team's statistical leaders included tailback Marion "Butch" Butler with 166 passing yards and wingback James Whitmire with 376 rushing yards and 24 points scored (4 touchdowns). Butler was selected as a first-team player on the 1943 All-South Carolina football team.

Schedule

References

Clemson
Clemson Tigers football seasons
Clemson Tigers football